Enzo Yáñez (born 13 September 1985) is a Chilean long distance runner who specialises in the marathon. He competed in the men's marathon event at the 2016 Summer Olympics.

On 19 March 2017, Yáñez won the Temuco Marathon with a time of 2:18:33, allowing him to qualify to the 2017 World Championships in Athletics.

References

External links
 

1985 births
Living people
Chilean male long-distance runners
Chilean male marathon runners
Place of birth missing (living people)
Athletes (track and field) at the 2016 Summer Olympics
Olympic athletes of Chile
People from Valdivia